The 1980–81 season was Mansfield Town's 44th season in the Football League and 7th in the Fourth Division they finished in 7th position with 49 points.

Final league table

Results

Football League Fourth Division

FA Cup

League Cup

Squad statistics
 Squad list sourced from

References
General
 Mansfield Town 1980–81 at soccerbase.com (use drop down list to select relevant season)

Specific

Mansfield Town F.C. seasons
Mansfield Town